Patrik Ingelsten (born 25 January 1982) is a Swedish football coach and former player, who played as a winger and forward.

Playing career
Ingelsten started his career in Hillerstorps GoIF and played there until 1999 when he moved to IFK Värnamo, there he played for two seasons under former Swedish international star Jonas Thern and when Thern became new manager for Halmstads BK he brought Ingelsten with him, during his time in Halmstads BK he made several appearance but failed to gain the liking of the supporters, he won Stora Silvret (eng: The Big Silver) in 2004 when Halmstad missed the Allsvenskan title in the final game, he also scored the goal that would send the 2005 UEFA Cup Final runners-up Sporting Lisbon out of the 2005–06 UEFA Cup. In 2007 Ingelsten was sold to Kalmar FF, yet again winning the Stora Silvret and also winning Svenska Cupen the same year. In 2008, he became the top goalscorer in Allsvenskan with 19 goals, helping Kalmar FF win the league. This also earned him a spot in the national team against Portugal after Markus Rosenberg got injured prior to the 2010 FIFA World Cup qualification on Råsunda but never came on as a substitute.

On 22 December 2008, it was reported that he had signed for SC Heerenveen, following Viktor Elm. He scored his first Heerenveen goal in a cup win against NEC Nijmegen on 4 March 2009 and his first league goal on 14 March at home against Sparta Rotterdam.

Ingelsten was Åge Hareide's first big signing as head coach of Viking. Ingelsten wage was lower than during his time in the Dutch club, but he was still one of their best paid players during his four seasons with the club. His contract expired after the 2013 season, when the club did not agree with Ingelsten on a new contract. Viking's local rivals, Sandnes Ulf offered a contract to Ingelsten, but he moved instead home to Sweden where he signed a two-year contract with Mjällby.

Managerial career
In February 2016 Ingelsten signed a contract with IS Halmia as a playing manager. He had much success here and left the club at the end of the year, to join GAIS both as an assistant manager and sporting director.

After GAIS manager Benjamin Westman got fired on 4 June 2017, Ingelsten was appointed caretaker manager of the club. He returned to the assistant manager position ahead of the 2018 season. In July 2019, he was appointed caretaker manager once again after the departure of Bosko Orović, which in September 2019 was turned permanently. He left on 27 November 2019.

Career statistics

Honours
Kalmar FF:
 Allsvenskan: 2008
 Svenska Cupen: 2007

SC Heerenveen
 KNVB Cup: 2009

Individual
 Allsvenskan top scorer: 2008

References

External links
 IMScouting.com has selected Patrik Ingelsten as "Player to Watch" (4 September 2008)
 Kalmar FF profile 
 Halmstads BK profile 
 

1982 births
Living people
Association football wingers
Association football forwards
Swedish footballers
Swedish football managers
IFK Värnamo players
Halmstads BK players
Kalmar FF players
SC Heerenveen players
Viking FK players
Mjällby AIF players
GAIS players
Falkenbergs FF players
Eredivisie players
Allsvenskan players
Eliteserien players
Swedish expatriate footballers
Expatriate footballers in the Netherlands
Expatriate footballers in Norway
Swedish expatriate sportspeople in the Netherlands
Swedish expatriate sportspeople in Norway
GAIS managers